"The Glass Floor" is a short story by Stephen King, first published in the autumn 1967 issue of Startling Mystery Stories. It was King's first professional sale.

Plot summary 
Charles Wharton visits Anthony Reynard, the recently widowed husband of Wharton's sister Janine, in his Victorian mansion, the appearance of which unsettles Wharton. Reynard tells Wharton that Janine died by falling off a ladder while dusting the mansion's East Room, breaking her neck. When Wharton asks to see the room, Reynard refuses, telling him the door to the room has been plastered over. When Wharton protests, Reynard's elderly housekeeper Louise explains that the East Room – which has a floor made entirely out of mirror glass – is regarded as "dangerous". 

At Wharton's insistence, Reynard gives him a trowel and allows him to reopen the East Room, refusing to watch. Upon entering the room, Wharton is quickly disoriented by the mirrored floor; fancying that he is standing in mid-air, he panics and calls for help. Reynard finds Wharton's body lying in the middle of the room; he removes it using a pole hook, leaving a small pool of blood on both the floor and ceiling. As he prepares to once again plaster the East Room shut, Reynard wonders "if there was really a mirror there at all".

Publication 
King wrote "The Glass Floor" in the summer of 1967 at the age of 19. It was the first of his submissions (over the course of two years) to magazine editor Robert A. W. Lowndes to be accepted for publication. King earned $35 for the story, marking his first professional earnings from writing. "The Glass Floor" was first published in the autumn 1967 issue of Startling Mystery Stories. It was later published (with some minor amendments) in issue #298 of Weird Tales in autumn 1990 and in issue #68 of Cemetery Dance in December 2012. In 2020, it was published as part of the trade hardcover Best of Cemetery Dance 2. It has never been collected in a work by King.

Reception 
Michael R. Collings described "The Glass Floor" as "derivative, depending upon Poe and Lovecraft for its situational and atmospheric horror", while regarding it as an improvement on the "workaday prose" of King's earlier work. George Beahm also regarded the story as "derivative", but judged it to be "a first effort that requires no apology".

Revisiting the story after 23 years in 1990, King described the first several pages as "clumsy and badly written - clearly the product of an unformed story-teller's mind" but judged the climax to be "better than I remembered" with "a genuine frisson".

Rocky Wood notes two seeming factual errors in the story: Reynard's mansion bears the date 1770 but is contrastingly described as "Victorian" (1770 being part of the Georgian era)  and "Revolutionary War vintage" (the American Revolutionary War lasting from 1775 to 1783).

References

See also
 Stephen King short fiction bibliography
 Unpublished and uncollected works by Stephen King

External links 
 "The Glass Floor" at StephenKing.com

Short stories by Stephen King
1967 short stories
Horror short stories
Works originally published in American magazines
Works originally published in mystery fiction magazines